Rachel Ashley Platten (born May 20, 1981) is an American singer-songwriter and author. After releasing two albums independently in 2003 and 2011, she signed with Columbia Records in 2015 and released her mainstream debut single, "Fight Song", which peaked at number 6 on the Billboard Hot 100 in the United States, topped charts in the United Kingdom, and peaked within the top ten of multiple charts worldwide. Platten won a Daytime Emmy Award for a live performance of the song on Good Morning America. Her major-label debut studio album, Wildfire (2016), was certified gold by the Recording Industry Association of America (RIAA) and featured the follow-up singles "Stand by You" and "Better Place". Her second major-label album, Waves (2017), followed a year later.

Platten has done several other things outside of music. Platten appeared as a model in clothing brand Aerie's advertising campaign in photos that have not been retouched. She appeared on the cover of The Improper Bostonian magazine's May 2018 issue.

Platten has supported numerous charities, including, Music Unites, Ryan Seacrest Foundation, Autism Speaks, Los Angeles LGBT Center, Memorial Sloan-Kettering, Boys & Girls Clubs of America, BuildOn, and Live Below the Line. She has worked with Musicians on Call since the early 2000s, and is part of a program where she sings bedside to hospital patients. Platten has volunteered for over 50 Musicians On Call programs. The organization honored Platten for her volunteer work with Music Heals Award at a benefit event on December 1, 2015. Platten performed at Global Down Syndrome Foundation's virtual fashion show on November 14, 2020.

Early life
Platten was born on May 20, 1981, in New York City to Paul and Pamela Platten, but grew up in Newton Centre, Massachusetts and attended the Mason-Rice Elementary School. Her mother is a therapist. She was raised Jewish. She has a younger sister, Melanie. Platten studied classical piano from the age of 5 and then took up guitar in high school. She attended Buckingham Browne and Nichols high school, where she sang in the school's singing group. At Trinity College, she was a member of the Trinity College Trinitones, the college's first all-female a cappella group.

As a part of a study abroad program, she went to Trinidad to do an internship at a diplomat's office and at a record label. While she was there, she sang backup for a friend's band in front of over 80,000 people at the International Soca Monarch finals in 2002. According to Platten, from that moment on she knew she had to pursue music full-time.

Platten graduated from Trinity College with a degree in political science in 2003. She moved to New York City's Greenwich Village, recorded demos, and performed in a Prince and Sly and the Family Stone cover band called Dayz of Wild. She worked several jobs, including as a waitress, a jingle writer, and an Estée Lauder salesperson. She performed her solo music around the Village and eventually began touring the country.

Career

2011–2014: Be Here
Her first album, Be Here, was released from Rock Ridge Music in April 2011. The single "1,000 Ships" peaked at number 24 on the US Billboard Adult Top 40 chart, also playing at various radio stations. An earlier song, "Seven Weeks", was used for the film The Good Guy. The theme song for ABC Family's Jane by Design, "Work of Art", was performed by Platten on hire. Her song "Begin Again" was used in Freeform's teen drama television series Pretty Little Liars' 100th episode, "Miss Me x 100". Her songs "Don't Care What Time It Is" was used in VH1's Basketball Wives and "You're Safe" was used in MTV's Finding Carter in September 2014. On June 27, 2014, Platten debuted "Fight Song" on the social networking website We Heart It as part of an artist spotlight.

2015–2017: Wildfire

On February 19, 2015, Platten released "Fight Song" from Wildfire. The song reached number six on the US Billboard Hot 100, number two on the Australian Singles Chart, number six in Ireland, number eight in New Zealand, number nine on the Billboard Canadian Hot 100, and number one on the UK Singles Chart. In June 2015, Platten performed "Fight Song" with Taylor Swift in front of 50,000 people in Philadelphia during Swift's The 1989 World Tour. "Fight Song" has quintuple platinum sales in the US. Platten's 2015 Fight Song EP reached number 20 on the Billboard 200, and it was the official anthem for the 2016 Democratic presidential nominee Hillary Clinton.

Platten served as a support act on Alex & Sierra's and Andy Grammer's "The Good Guys & A Girl Tour" in early 2015. She then toured with Colbie Caillat and Christina Perri on their "Girls Night Out, Boys Can Come Too Tour" throughout the summer of 2015. On September 11, 2015, Platten released second single named "Stand by You" from Wildfire. It peaked in the top 10 on charts in Canada and the United States, and has peaked in the top 20 on charts in Australia and Poland. The song has since been certified Platinum in the United States.

After the Orlando nightclub shooting, Platten announced that proceeds from the new acoustic version of her "Fight Song" will benefit the National Compassion Fund, working to support the needs of people impacted by the event.

In October 2016, Platten sang "The Star-Spangled Banner" prior to Game 1 of the 2016 World Series. On New Year's Eve 2016, Platten co-headlined the Times Square Ball festivities in New York City's Times Square alongside Gavin DeGraw performing "Fight Song", "Stand by You", "Beating Me Up", and John Lennon's "Imagine".

In 2017, Platten served as an opening act for two Los Angeles shows and one Las Vegas show on Faith Hill and Tim McGraw’s Soul2Soul: The World Tour.

2017–present: Waves 
"Broken Glass", the lead single from her fourth studio album, Waves, was released on August 18, 2017. The album was released on October 27, 2017.

In 2018, Platten was the main musical attraction at the Boston Pops Fireworks Spectacular. Along with performing her singles "Stand By You", "Better Place", and "Fight Song", she also reminisced about her childhood in Boston.

From May to July 2019, Platten toured with a capella group Pentatonix as the opening act for their shows in North America. She wrote a children's book titled You Belong, named after her 2018 single; the book was released on March 31, 2020. In 2022, she performed "Stand By You" at A Capitol Fourth Independence Day concert in Washington, D.C., which aired on PBS on July 4, 2022.

Public image 
Platten worked for nearly a decade playing cover performances and recording songs before gaining mainstream recognition as an artist. Platten's story and "Fight Song" has served as an inspiration for people around the world, who have used it as a motivation not to lose hope, when experiencing difficulties in life such as cancer, postpartum depression, and unemployment. In 2017, she was presented with Gracies Impact Award, which is given to an artist who has made a positive impact on society through their music. She wrote "Fight Song" at a low point, saying:In January 2018, Platten appeared as a model in clothing brand Aerie's advertising campaign in photos that have not been retouched. She appeared on the cover of The Improper Bostonian magazine's May 2018 issue.

Philanthropy 
Platten has supported numerous charities, including, Music Unites, Ryan Seacrest Foundation, Autism Speaks, Los Angeles LGBT Center, Memorial Sloan-Kettering, Boys & Girls Clubs of America, BuildOn, and Live Below the Line.

She has worked with Musicians on Call since the early 2000s, and is part of a program where she sings bedside to hospital patients. Platten has volunteered for over 50 Musicians On Call programs. The organization honored Platten for her volunteer work with Music Heals Award at a benefit event on December 1, 2015. She performed "Fight Song" and walked the runway at the American Heart Association’s Go Red For Women Red Dress Collection 2017 fashion show presented by Macy’s at New York Fashion Week on February 9, 2017.

Platten performed at Global Down Syndrome Foundation's virtual fashion show on November 14, 2020.

Personal life
On July 31, 2010, Platten married Kevin Lazan in a Jewish ceremony. Their wedding pictures were featured in Southern New England Weddings magazine in 2010. They have two daughters: Violet Skye, born on January 26, 2019, and Sophie Jo, born on September 9, 2021. She has openly discussed experiencing postpartum anxiety after the births of her daughters.

Discography

 Trust in Me (2003)
 Be Here (2011)
 Wildfire (2016)
 Waves (2017)

Filmography

As herself

Awards and nominations

Tours

Headlining 

 The Wildfire Tour (2016)

Co-headlining 

 Girls Night Out, Boys Can Come Too Tour (with Colbie Caillat and Christina Perri) (2015)

Supporting act 

 The Good Guys & A Girl Tour (Alex & Sierra and Andy Grammer)

Opening act 

 Soul2Soul: The World Tour (Faith Hill and Tim McGraw) (2017)
 Pentatonix: The World Tour (Pentatonix) (2019)

References

External links

 
 

1981 births
American women singer-songwriters
American women pop singers
Jewish American songwriters
Buckingham Browne & Nichols School alumni
Columbia Records artists
Living people
Jewish women singers
Musicians from Newton, Massachusetts
Singers from New York City
Rock Ridge Music artists
Singer-songwriters from Massachusetts
People from Newton, Massachusetts
Daytime Emmy Award winners
21st-century American women singers
21st-century American singers
Trinity College (Connecticut) alumni
21st-century American Jews
Singer-songwriters from New York (state)
American pop rock singers